The Republic of Korea (commonly known as South Korea) and the Democratic People's Republic of Korea (commonly known as North Korea) were simultaneously admitted to the United Nations (UN) in 1991. On 8 August 1991, the UN Security Council passed United Nations Security Council Resolution 702, recommending both states to the UN General Assembly for membership. On 17 September 1991, the General Assembly admitted both countries under Resolution 46/1.

History

Observers (1948–1991) 
On 12 December 1948, The Republic of Korea was officially recognized by the UN General Assembly (UNGA) under Resolution 195. From that point, South Korea participated in the GA as an observer.

Both South Korea and North Korea applied for membership in the UN in 1949, but no action was taken on their applications at that time as the Soviet Union opposed the admission of South Korea. 

In 1950, North Korea invaded South Korea, and the Korean War commenced. The UN Security Council denounced the invasion, and "recommended that Members of the United Nations furnish such assistance to the Republic of Korea as may be necessary to repel the armed attack and to restore international peace and security in the area," and "that all Members providing military forces and other assistance...make such forces and other assistance available to a unified command under the United States of America," and authorized this new United Nations Command "at its discretion to use the United Nations flag in the course of operations against North Korean forces..." Sixteen nations responded by sending combat troops (and five other countries sent humanitarian aid) to support South Korea.

Coming with change of recognition in 1971 of the Chinese seat, North Korea also gained observer status in 1973.

As the Cold War came to a close, South Korea announced in 1991 that it would seek its own membership in the UN. North Korea had previously opposed separate membership in the UN for itself and South Korea because it opposed the permanent recognition of "two Koreas". However, with no prospect of a Chinese or Soviet veto of South Korea's bid, North Korea announced that it would also seek UN membership, stating that North Korea "has no alternative but to enter the United Nations at the present stage" to avoid having "important issues related to the interests of the entire Korean nation [being] dealt with in a biased manner on the U.N. rostrum." South Korea's Foreign Ministry welcomed North Korea's application, saying that separate memberships for the two Koreas would "greatly contribute to easing tension ... and also facilitate the process of peaceful reunification." The UN Security Council unanimously recommended both North Korea and South Korea for membership, with the two countries being admitted on 17 September 1991.

North Korea and the UN (1991–present) 
North Korea has never held a seat on the UN Security Council. It has a Permanent Mission to the UN in New York City, and additionally maintains a mission to the UN in Paris and an Ambassador to the UN at the UN Office at Geneva.

As of 2018, since 2005, the UNGA has adopted a resolution every year to condemn the human rights situation in North Korea.

In December 2019, US Ambassador to the United Nations Kelly Craft said during a meeting of the UN Security Council (which was called at her request) that the US was prepared to take "simultaneous steps" with North Korea to achieve peace. But she also warned the North Koreans against conducting further missile tests.

South Korea and the UN (1991–present) 
South Korea has twice been elected to a non-permanent seat of the UN Security Council, first in the 1995 election for 1996–97 and again in the 2012 election for 2013–14.

In 2001, Han Seung-soo of South Korea held the presidency of the UNGA. In 2006, Ban Ki-moon from South Korea was elected as the Secretary-General of the United Nations. He was re-elected in 2011.

See also
List of United Nations Security Council resolutions concerning North Korea

Notes

References

Further reading

External links
 Ministry of Foreign Affairs of the Republic of Korea.
 Permanent Mission of the Republic of Korea to the United Nations .
 UN General Assembly Resolution 195.
 Documents at the Wilson Center Digital Archive.

 
United Nations